Cerro Picacho may refer to:

Cerro Picacho (Chiriquí)
Cerro Picacho (Panamá Oeste)